Shur Bolagh or Shurbolagh may refer to various places in Iran:
 Shur Bolagh, Ardabil
 Shur Bolagh, Ravansar, Kermanshah Province
 Shur Bolagh, Sahneh, Kermanshah Province
 Shur Bolagh, Markazi
 Shur Bolagh, Chaldoran, West Azerbaijan Province
 Shur Bolagh, Khoy, West Azerbaijan Province
 Shurbolagh-e Olya, Poldasht County, West Azerbaijan Province
 Shurbolagh-e Sofla, Poldasht County, West Azerbaijan Province